Village of the Damned may refer to:

Film
 Village of the Damned (1960 film)
 Village of the Damned (1995 film), the 1995 remake

Literature
 The Midwich Cuckoos, the John Wyndham novel, also released as Village of the Damned, on which the 1960 and 1995 movies are based
 "Village of the Damned", a 2005 article by David McKie in The Guardian about Bowerchalke

Music
 Village of the Damned (soundtrack), the soundtrack to the 1995 film
 "Village of the Damned" (song), a 2004 song by The Hacker off the album Rêves Mécaniques
 "Village of the Damned" (song), a 2014 song by Hollywood Monsters (band) off the album Big Trouble

Television
 "Village of the Damned" (Scream), 2016 season 2 number 8 episode 18 of the horror TV show Scream
 "Village of the Damned" (episode), a 1991 season 2 number 13 episode 35 of Counterstrike (1990 TV series)
 "Village of the Damned" (episode), a 2001 season 2 number 2 TV episode of Scariest Places on Earth; see List of Scariest Places on Earth episodes
 Village of the Damned (mini-series), a 2008 TV mini-series in the TV show Most Haunted from North Wales Hospital in Denbigh
 Village of the Damned: Welcome to Dryden, a 2017 TV documentary series about Dryden
 'Village of the Damned: The Nithari Child Murders' (episode), an episode of RedHanded about the 2006 Noida serial murders

Other uses
 "The Village of the Damned", a fictional location from the 1998 videogame Of Light and Darkness: The Prophecy

See also

 Damned (disambiguation)
 Village (disambiguation)

Ophthalmic conditions emphasizing symbolism